Dobryanskoye Urban Settlement is a municipal formation (an urban settlement) within Dobryansky Municipal District of Perm Krai, Russia, which a part of the territory of the town of krai significance of Dobryanka is incorporated as. It is one of the two urban settlements in the municipal district.

References

Notes

Sources

Urban settlements of Russia
Geography of Perm Krai